Pico del Este (Spanish for peak of the east) is a mountain peak in the southern portion of the Sierra de Luquillo, located on the boundary between the municipalities of Ceiba and Naguabo in eastern Puerto Rico. A radar complex built by the US Navy can be found in the summit of the mountain. Known as the Old Navy Radar, these facilities remain decommissioned and abandoned.

Geography 
Pico del Este and, its neighboring peak, Pico del Oeste are located within El Yunque National Forest on a mountain massif that is connected to El Yunque through a northwestward ridge known as Cuchilla el Duque.

Gallery

References 

Mountains of Puerto Rico
Ceiba, Puerto Rico
Naguabo, Puerto Rico
Mountains of the Caribbean